Plaza Insurgentes is an enclosed neighborhood shopping center along Avenida Insurgentes in Colonia Roma, Mexico City. It opened in 1999 on the site of the first Sears Mexico store which had opened in 1947 and was subdivided to add mall stores. When the Sears was built, it was far from the upscale shopping districts at that time, downtown along Avenida Juárez and the department stores just south of the Zócalo.

Plaza Insurgentes is anchored by a Sears, Sanborns restaurant and junior department store, and a Cinemex multicinema. It measures  of gross leasable area with 31 stores distributed over 2 levels, with parking for 807 cars and 150,000 visitors per month. A freestanding Woolworth and multistory freestanding Miniso also line Avenida Insurgentes nearby, forming a small shopping district.

References

Shopping malls in Greater Mexico City
Colonia Roma
Sears Holdings